Asymmetricospora is a genus of fungi in the family Melanommataceae.

References

Melanommataceae